Tongayi Arnold Chirisa is a Zimbabwean actor known for playing Man Friday on NBC's Crusoe television series, Father Nicholas on The Jim Gaffigan Show, and Hekule on Leon Schuster's Mr. Bones 2: Back from the Past movie. He is also an occasional singer.

Education
Chirisa attended Lomagundi College. He also studied for a Bachelor of Arts in Live Performance at AFDA, The School for the Creative Economy.

Acting career
He played the part of "Detective Trevor Davies" in the popular Zimbabwean television series Studio 263. He also appeared in numerous feature films, the most well known being Tanyaradzwa in 2004, for which he won the Best Actor for Film and Television Award. He has also featured in music videos and is a singer. He also starred in a serial radio drama Mopani Junction that was taken off air at the height of political turmoil in Zimbabwe. He has been nominated and won many NAMA Awards over the last five years. He recently played the lead in the comedy feature film Mr Bones 2: Back from the Past. He made a dramatic appearance in the mini-series Rough directed by British director, Andy Wilson, appeared in an international feature film Skin, directed by Anthony Fabian and co-starring Sam Neill, and played a lead in a local drama series Redemption for SABC 1. He played Man Friday on the NBC international television series Crusoe, based on the classic story Robinson Crusoe. He also appeared in Sleepy Hollow based on The Legend of Sleepy Hollow by Washington Irving. He played Father Nicholas on The Jim Gaffigan Show (2017).

Filmography

Film

Television

References

External links 

Zimbabwean male film actors
Living people
Zimbabwean male television actors
21st-century Zimbabwean male singers
21st-century Zimbabwean male actors
Place of birth missing (living people)
Alumni of Lomagundi College
1981 births